The Turco-Mongol or Turko-Mongol tradition was an ethnocultural synthesis that arose in Asia during the 14th century, among the ruling elites of the Golden Horde and the Chagatai Khanate. The ruling Mongol elites of these Khanates eventually assimilated into the Turkic populations that they conquered and ruled over, thus becoming known as Turco-Mongols. These elites gradually adopted Islam (from previous religions such as Tengrism) as well as Turkic languages, while retaining Mongol political and legal institutions.

The Turco-Mongols founded many Islamic successor states after the collapse of the Mongol Khanates, such as the Kazakh Khanate and Tatar Khanates that succeeded the Golden Horde (e.g., Khanate of Crimea, Astrakhan Khanate, Kazan Khanate) and the Timurid Empire, which succeeded the Chagatai Khanate in Central Asia. Babur (1483–1530), a Turco-Mongol prince and a great-great-great-grandson of Timur, founded the Mughal Empire, which ruled almost all of the Indian subcontinent. The Turks and Tatars also ruled part of Egypt, exercising political and military authority during the Mamluk Sultanate.

These Turco-Mongol elites became patrons of the Turco-Persian tradition, which was the predominant culture amongst the Muslims of Central Asia at the time. In subsequent centuries, the Turco-Persian culture was carried on further by the conquering Turco-Mongols to neighbouring regions, eventually becoming the predominant culture of the ruling and elite classes of South Asia (Indian subcontinent), specifically North India (Mughal Empire), Central Asia and the Tarim Basin (Northwest China) and large parts of West Asia (Middle East).

Antecedence

Before the time of Genghis Khan, Turkic peoples and Mongols exchanged words between each other, with Turkic languages being more active than Mongolian. A much earlier Turco-Mongol tradition existed, as evidenced by the extensive lexical borrowings from Proto-Turkic in the Proto-Mongolic language from around at least the first millennium BCE. Turkic and Mongolic languages share extensive borrowed similarities in their personal pronouns, among other lexical similarities, which seem to date to before this era and already existed before the breakup of the Turkic people around 500 BCE. A still more ancient period of prolonged language contact between Turkic and Mongol languages is indicated by further and more fundamental phonotactic, grammatical, and typological similarities (e.g. synchronic vowel harmony, lack of grammatical gender, extensive agglutination, highly similar phonotactic rules and phonology). 

In the past, these similarities were attributed to a genetic relationship and led to the widespread acceptance of an Altaic language family. More recently, due to the lack of a definitive demonstration of genetic relationship, these similarities have been divided into these three known periods of language contact. The similarities have led to the proposal of a Northeast Asian sprachbund instead, which also includes the Tungusic, Korean, and Japonic language families, although Turkic and Mongolic display the most extensive similarities. According to recent aggregation and research, there are doublets, which are considered to be the same in terms of their roots, found in the vocabulary in Mongolian language and Turkic loanwords. Also, inside the Mongolian vocabulary that is derived from other languages, Turkic is the most common.

Language
Following the Mongol conquests, the ruling Mongol elites of the Mongol successor states began a process of assimilation with the non-Mongol populations that they ruled over. The population of the Golden Horde was largely a mixture of Turks and Mongols who adopted Islam later, as well as smaller numbers of Finnic peoples, Sarmato-Scythians, Slavs, and people from the Caucasus, among others (whether Muslim or not). 

Most of the Horde's population was Turkic: Kipchaks, Cumans, Volga Bulgars, Khwarezmians, and others. The Horde was gradually Turkified and lost its Mongol identity, while the descendants of Batu's original Mongol warriors constituted the upper class. They were commonly named the Tatars by the Russians and Europeans. Russians preserved this common name for this group down to the 20th century. Whereas most members of this group identified themselves by their ethnic or tribal names, most also considered themselves to be Muslims. Most of the population, both agricultural and nomadic, adopted the Kypchak language, which developed into the regional languages of Kypchak groups after the Horde disintegrated.

In the Chagatai Khanate, the Turkic language that was adopted by the Mongol elites became known as the Chagatai language, a descendant of Karluk Turkic. The Chagatai language was the native language of the Timurid dynasty, a Turco-Mongol dynasty who gained power in Central Asia after the decline of the Chagatai Khans. Chagatai is the predecessor of the modern Karluk branch of Turkic languages, which includes Uzbek and Uyghur.

Religion
The Mongols during the period of the early Mongol conquests and the conquests of Genghis Khan largely followed Tengrism. However, the successor states of the Mongol Empire, the Ilkhanate, Golden Horde and Chagatai Khanate ruled over large Muslim populations with the Ilkhanate and Chagatai Khanate ruling over Muslim majority populations in Iran and Central Asia respectively.

In the Golden Horde, Uzbeg (Öz-Beg) assumed the throne in 1313 and adopted Islam as the state religion. He proscribed Buddhism and Shamanism among the Mongols in Russia, thus reversing the spread of the Yuan culture. By 1315, Uzbeg had successfully Islamicized the Horde, killing Jochid princes and Buddhist lamas who opposed his religious policy and succession of the throne. Uzbeg Khan continued the alliance with the Mamluks begun by Berke and his predecessors. He kept a friendly relationship with the Mamluk Sultan and his shadow Caliph in Cairo. After a long delay and much discussion, he married a princess of the blood to Al-Nasir Muhammad, Sultan of Egypt. Under Uzbeg and his successor Jani Beg (1342–1357), Islam, which among some of the Turks in Eurasia had deep roots going back into pre-Mongol times, gained general acceptance, though its adherents remained tolerant of other beliefs. 

In order to successfully expand Islam, the Mongols built a mosque and other "elaborate places" requiring baths—an important element of Muslim culture. Sarai attracted merchants from other countries. The slave trade flourished due to strengthening ties with the Mamluk Sultanate. Growth of wealth and increasing demand for products typically produce population growth, and so it was with Sarai. Housing in the region increased, which transformed the capital into the center of a large Muslim Sultanate.

In the Chagatai Khanate, Mubarak Shah converted to Islam and over time the Chagatai elite became entirely Islamized. The Chagatai Khanate was succeeded by the Timurid Empire in Central Asia, founded by the Turco-Mongol warrior Timur. According to John Joseph Saunders, Timur was "the product of an Islamized and Iranized society", and not steppe nomadic. To legitimize his conquests, Timur relied on Islamic symbols and language, referred to himself as the "Sword of Islam", and patronized educational and religious institutions. He converted nearly all the Borjigin leaders to Islam during his lifetime. Timur decisively defeated the Christian Knights Hospitaller at the Siege of Smyrna, styling himself a ghazi.

See also

References

Turkic culture
Mongol peoples
14th century
Ethnology